Clinton Emil "Clint" McElroy, Jr. (born August 10, 1955) is an American podcaster, comic book writer and former radio personality. He is known for his work on the podcast The Adventure Zone, as well as for hosting several FM radio shows in West Virginia. Additionally, McElroy is an adjunct professor in the Department of Theatre at Marshall University.

Career

Radio
Clint McElroy is an alumnus of Marshall University, at which he worked with campus radio station WMUL. He then worked as news director at WKEE-FM in 1975, followed by roles at WRVC and WEMM-FM, as well as a sports director role at WWBA in Florida. Beginning in 1994, he co-hosted the morning show at WTCR-FM, along with co-host Judy Eaton. In 2017, he retired from radio.

Podcasting
In 2014, Clint McElroy and his sons – Justin, Travis, and Griffin – launched a tabletop role-playing game podcast entitled The Adventure Zone. Initially playing Dungeons & Dragons, the show moved into other game systems in later arcs. Clint acted as Game Master during the 'experimental' campaign Commitment, which made use of the Fate system.

During the first arc, Balance, Clint portrayed Merle Highchurch, a dwarf cleric. In the second campaign, Amnesty, he portrayed Ned Chicane, and later Arlo Thacker. For the show's third campaign, Graduation, he portrayed Argo Keene, a water genasi rogue. In the fourth campaign, Ethersea, he portrayed Zoox, a Brinarr ranger.

In 2018, Clint McElroy appeared as a guest star on Adventure Impractical as part of the Stream of Many Eyes, a Dungeons & Dragons event promoting the new Waterdeep storyline. He also appeared at the following year's event, The Descent.

In 2020, Clint McElroy appeared as a guest voice in Sidequesting. 

Amid the COVID-19 pandemic in 2020, Clint began the daily YouTube series Stories from Your Gaffer, in which he reads chapters from books, in lieu of bedtime stories for his grandchildren. He began with The Hobbit, though had to switch to The Wonderful Wizard of Oz for copyright reasons. Neil Gaiman granted permission for his books, and so Clint then moved on to Coraline.

Comics 
Clint wrote several comic books for NOW Comics in the early 1990s, such as Green Hornet: Dark Tomorrow and adaptations of the movies Freejack and Universal Soldier. He also wrote for Eclipse Comics with Blood is the Harvest in 1992. This was among the final comics printed by the group, which ceased operation in 1994.

Beginning with Here There Be Gerblins in 2018, Clint McElroy co-wrote a series of graphic novel adaptations of The Adventure Zone: Balance, releasing one volume each summer. The four volumes released to date were highly successful, becoming New York Times bestsellers.

Along with his sons, Clint co-wrote Journey into Mystery, a five-part limited series as part of Marvel's War of the Realms storyline. Alongside this, McElroy would work on Marvel Team-up #4 that year.

Personal life 
Clint McElroy spent his early years in Ironton, Ohio, where he attended Ironton High School and eventually Ohio University Southern Campus and then Marshall University, located in Huntington, West Virginia.

He married Leslie Gail McElroy (née Kitchen) in 1977. They had three children: Justin, Travis, and Griffin. Leslie died in 2005. McElroy remarried in 2010. He has one stepdaughter.

Works 
 Freejack, NOW Comics, 1992 
 Universal Soldier, NOW Comics, 1992
 Blood Is the Harvest, Eclipse Comics, 1992
 The Green Hornet vol. 2, #10, 23, NOW Comics, 1992
 The Green Hornet: Dark Tomorrow, NOW Comics, 1993
 3 Ninjas Kick Back, NOW Comics, 1994
 The Adventure Zone: Here There Be Gerblins, First Second Books, 2018
 War of the Realms: Journey into Mystery, Marvel, 2019
 Marvel Team-Up vol. 4, #4–6, Marvel, 2019
 The Adventure Zone: Murder on the Rockport Limited!, First Second Books, 2019
 Marvel Comics #1001, Marvel, 2019 (limited 80th anniversary series)
 The Adventure Zone: Petals to the Metal, First Second Books, 2020
 The Adventure Zone: The Crystal Kingdom, First Second Books, 2021
 Goldie's Guide to Grandchilding, First Second Books, 2022 (picture book)
 The Adventure Zone: The Eleventh Hour, First Second Books, 2023

Awards and achievements
In 2009, Clint McElroy was inducted into the Greater Huntington Wall of Fame, in recognition of his contributions to local radio as well as local theater.

In 2021, a newly discovered species of millipede was named Nannaria mcelroyorum in recognition of the McElroy family's podcasts, which entertained the scientists during their field work. The millipede is found in West Virginia as well as the wider Appalachian region.

References

1955 births
American comics writers
American podcasters
American radio hosts
Living people
Marshall University alumni
McElroy family
People from Ironton, Ohio
Radio personalities from Ohio